Radek John (born 6 December 1954) is a Czech journalist, writer, screenwriter and politician who served as the Minister of Interior from 2010 to 2011 and as Leader of the Public Affairs party from 2009 to 2013. His novel Memento is the first book examining the drug problem in the context of the former communist Czechoslovakia. The novel was translated into ten languages.

From 13 July 2010 to 21 April 2011 he served as the Minister of Interior of the Czech Republic.

Early life 
To 1979 he studied screenwriting and graduated from the Film and TV School of the Academy of Performing Arts in Prague (FAMU). From 1980 till 1993 he worked as an editor of Mladý Svět magazine. He then worked as a screenwriter at Barrandov Film Studios.

References 

Living people
1954 births
Czech male writers
Czech journalists
Public Affairs (political party) politicians
Interior ministers of the Czech Republic
Writers from Prague
Politicians from Prague
Academy of Performing Arts in Prague alumni
Members of the Chamber of Deputies of the Czech Republic (2010–2013)